Joseph Anton Nikolaus Settegast (8 February 1813, Koblenz - 19 March 1890, Mainz) was a German church painter and one of the last representatives of the Nazarene movement.

Life
He received his first art instruction from 1829 to 1831 at the Kunstakademie Düsseldorf. However, he became dissatisfied with the quality of the teaching there and went to study with Philipp Veit, at the Städel Art Institute in Frankfurt, where he remained until 1838. During this time, he produced many altar and devotional paintings, including an altarpiece at the parish church in Bad Camberg, done together with his friend, .

From 1838 to 1843 he made several study trips to Italy and lived in Rome. There he became a member of the "Komponiervereins", a Nazarene association.

After his return, he married Dorothea Veit (1822-1897, his teacher's daughter). They had nine children altogether. At first they lived in Frankfurt, until 1849, then moved to Koblenz, then to Mainz in 1860. He executed commissions for many churches, including the Basilica of St. Castor in Koblenz and the Mainz Cathedral. Numerous images of saints were created for the "Verein zur Verbreitung religiöser Bilder" (Association for the Dissemination of Religious Images). He remained a lifelong admirer of the Nazarenes.

His last years were marred by a fall from a scaffold in Münster, which resulted in permanent injuries that restricted his ability to do large projects. Completely oblivious to new trends in art, his work was increasingly ignored.

Gallery

References

Further reading 
 Joseph Anton Nikolaus Settegast. In: Thieme-Becker, Allgemeines Lexikon der Bildenden Künstler von der Antike bis zur Gegenwart. Vol.XXX, E. A. Seemann, Leipzig 1936, pg.537. 
Clemens-Sels-Museum: Joseph Anton Nikolaus Settegast 1813–1890. Retrospektive zum 100. Todestag eines Spätnazareners. Exhibition catalog, Neuss, 1990

External links 

 
 Jutta Assel: Joseph Anton Settegast's Italian Journeys, with Excerpts from his Diaries and Letters @ Goethe Zeit

1813 births
1890 deaths
German male painters
Nazarene movement
19th-century German painters
19th-century German male artists